AAI may refer to:

Business
 AAI Corporation, a United States defense company
 Adam Aircraft Industries, a United States company
Ahrens Aircraft Inc, an aircraft manufacturer established at Oxnard, California
American Athletic Inc., an athletic apparel brand owned by Fruit of the Loom
Arlington Asset Investment, a real estate investment trust headquartered in Arlington, Virginia
AutoAlliance International, a joint-venture automobile assembly firm co-owned by Ford and Mazda
 Aviation Industries Ilyushin, a Russian company

Non-profit organizations 
 Adım Adım Initiative, a volunteer-based social initiative in Turkey that promotes charitable giving
 Africa-America Institute, an international organization dedicated to increasing educational opportunity for young Africans and improving global understanding of Africa
 AIESEC Alumni International, an international project of association for former volunteer members, executive boards, international trainees or staff of AIESEC
 Airline Ambassadors International, a non-profit organization
 American Antitrust Institute, an independent Washington-based non-profit education, research, and advocacy organization
 American Association of Immunologists, a non-profit organization dedicated to advancing the field of immunology
 Arab American Institute, a non-profit organization based in Washington D.C. that focuses on the issues and interests of Arab-Americans nationwide
 Architectural Association of Ireland, an organisation dedicated to architecture
 Asian Arts Initiative, a non-profit organization in Philadelphia
 Atheist Alliance International, a global network of atheist organizations around the world

Education 

Alliance Academy International, an international school following an American curriculum in Quito, Ecuador
Andreyev Acoustics Institute, a Russian research facility dedicated to the study of acoustics
Africa-America Institute, CIA run education organisation

Technology
 AAI, IATA airport code for Arraias Airport in Arraias, Tocantins, Brazil
 AAI Sparrowhawk, an American two seat pusher ultralight autogyro, available in kit form for amateur construction
 AAI Corporation Aerosonde, a small unmanned aerial vehicle (UAV) designed to collect weather data over oceans and remote areas
 AAI underwater revolver, an amphibious firearm intended for naval use
 Authentication and authorization infrastructure, access-control for network content

Science
 Alpha amylase inhibitor, a group of proteins that blocks the Enzyme Alpha-Amylase
 AAI mode of an artificial pacemaker: Atrial chamber paced, Atrial chamber sensed, and Inhibiting response to sensing
 Atlantoaxial instability, caused by laxity of the transverse ligament of atlas, a ligament which arches across the ring of the atlas (the topmost cervical vertebra, which directly supports the skull)

Entertainment
 Aai (film), an Indian Tamil language film starring R. Sarath Kumar, Namitha Kapoor, Vadivelu, Kalabhavan Mani
 AAI (album), 2021 album by Mouse on Mars
 Ace Attorney Investigations: Miles Edgeworth, a 2009 spin-off video game that's part of the Ace Attorney series

Sports 
Associação Atlética Iguaçu, a Brazilian football team from the city of União da Vitória, Paraná state
Athletics Ireland (Athletics Association of Ireland), governing body for athletics in Ireland

Other uses
 Arifama-Miniafia language, a language of Papua New Guinea
 Adult Attachment Interview, a method used in attachment theory
Airports Authority of India, a wing of the ministry of aviation in India
 Automatic Accounting Instructions, programming used by Oracle JD Edwards EnterpriseOne to determine how to distribute amounts associated with journal entries that the system generates.